Carabiner was one of seven s built for the French Navy in the first decade of the 20th century.

Design and description
The Spahi-class was over 50 percent larger than the preceding  to match the increase in size of foreign destroyers. The ships displaced  at deep load. Their crew numbered 77–79 officers and men.

Carabinier was powered by two triple-expansion steam engines, each driving one propeller shaft using steam provided by four Guyot boilers.

The primary armament of the Spahi-class ships consisted of six  Modèle 1902 guns in single mounts, one each fore and aft of the superstructure and the others were distributed amidships. They were also fitted with three  torpedo tubes. One of these was in a fixed mount in the bow and the other two were on single rotating mounts amidships.

Construction and career
Carabinier was ordered from Ateliers et Chantiers de Saint-Nazaire Penhoët and was launched at their shipyard in Saint-Nazaire on 10 October 1908. She was completed in October 1909.

On 13 November 1918, two days after the conclusion of World War I, Carabinier ran aground at Latakia, Syria, on the coast of the Ottoman Empire. She was scuttled on 15 November 1918.

References

Bibliography

 

Spahi-class destroyers
Ships built in France
1908 ships
Maritime incidents in 1918